Mellons Bay is an Auckland suburb.

Mellons Bay is south of Eastern Beach and north of Howick. It consists of two ridges joined by a wide steep gully facing east. It has a small beach.

Demographics

Mellons Bay had a population of 4,017 at the 2018 New Zealand census, an increase of 336 people (9.1%) since the 2013 census, and an increase of 423 people (11.8%) since the 2006 census. There were 1,365 households, comprising 1,989 males and 2,031 females, giving a sex ratio of 0.98 males per female. The median age was 44.1 years (compared with 37.4 years nationally), with 711 people (17.7%) aged under 15 years, 711 (17.7%) aged 15 to 29, 1,929 (48.0%) aged 30 to 64, and 663 (16.5%) aged 65 or older.

Ethnicities were 73.7% European/Pākehā, 4.4% Māori, 1.3% Pacific peoples, 25.2% Asian, and 2.4% other ethnicities. People may identify with more than one ethnicity.

The percentage of people born overseas was 42.0, compared with 27.1% nationally.

Although some people chose not to answer the census's question about religious affiliation, 49.1% had no religion, 39.9% were Christian, 0.1% had Māori religious beliefs, 0.7% were Hindu, 0.5% were Muslim, 2.2% were Buddhist and 2.0% had other religions.

Of those at least 15 years old, 1,137 (34.4%) people had a bachelor's or higher degree, and 273 (8.3%) people had no formal qualifications. The median income was $41,300, compared with $31,800 nationally. 1,005 people (30.4%) earned over $70,000 compared to 17.2% nationally. The employment status of those at least 15 was that 1,590 (48.1%) people were employed full-time, 540 (16.3%) were part-time, and 108 (3.3%) were unemployed.

Features

Uxbridge Art Gallery has been operating since 1981.

Education

References

External links
Photographs of Mellons Bay held in Auckland Libraries' heritage collections.

Suburbs of Auckland
Bays of the Auckland Region
Populated places around the Hauraki Gulf / Tīkapa Moana
Howick Local Board Area